The moss people or moss folk ("moss folk", wilde Leute, "wild folk"), also referred to as the wood people or wood folk (Holzleute, "wood folk") or forest folk (Waldleute, "forest-folk"), are a class of fairy folk, variously compared to dwarfs, elves, or spirits, described in the folklore of Germany as having an intimate connection to trees and the forest. In German, the words Schrat and Waldschrat are also used for a moss person. (Compare Old Norse skratti, "goblin".) The diminutive Schrätlein also serves as synonym for a nightmare creature.

They are sometimes described as similar to dwarfs, being the same size as children, but "grey and old-looking, hairy, and clad in moss." Sometimes, moss folk are also bigger. In other descriptions they are said to be pretty.

Origins 

Jacob Grimm believed that Gothic skōhsl, used to translate Koine Greek δαιμόνιον (daimonion), "demon", in the New Testament, was related to Old Norse skōgr and Old English sceaga, both meaning "forest", and therefore represented a cognate of the moss people in Gothic folklore. Subsequent authors, however, have related skōhsl with English "shuck" (from Old English scucca, "evil spirit") and German Scheusal, 
"monster" (from Middle High German schūsel, though by folk etymology identified with scheuen, "to dread", and -sal, a noun suffix).

Parallels have been drawn between the moss people and woodwoses. Early descriptions of Germanic beliefs include descriptions of "wood people" by the 6th century Roman historian Jordanes and "woodland women" by the 11th-century Rhenish bishop Burchard of Worms. Furthermore, Grimm recorded the terms wildiu wīp, wildero wībo, wilder wībe, wilden wībe, wildaz wīp (all meaning "wild wife") and wilde fröuwelīn ("wild maiden") from various early medieval texts.

In folklore 

According to legend, these fairies would occasionally borrow items from people or ask for help but would always compensate the owners generously, often with either good advice or bread. It was, however, easy to anger such wood-sprites, either by spurning their gifts (which might be the compensations named above) or by giving them caraway bread – of which they had a particular hatred, often being heard to utter the doggerel rhyme "Kümmelbrot, unser Tod!" ("Caraway bread, our death!").

In certain myths, the moss folk would ask humans for breast milk to feed their young, or steal little human children – motifs found in changeling lore.

Moss people, especially the females of the species, are able to send plagues on one hand, but on the other can also heal the victims of such plagues. During epidemics the Holzfräulein ("Wood ladies") would emerge from the forest to show the people which medicinal herbs could cure or ward off plague.

They were often but not always the object of the Wild Hunt. According to folklore, in order to escape the hunt they enter the trees that woodsmen have marked with a cross that will be chopped down.
Des Knaben Wunderhorn records "folk-songs [that] make the huntsman in the wood start a dark-brown maid, and hail her: 'whither away, wild beast?', but his mother did not take to the bride."

The moss people are similar to hamadryads. Their lives are "attached to the trees; if any one causes by friction the inner bark to loosen a Wood-woman dies."

According to Jacob Grimm:
"Between Leidhecken and Dauernheim in the Wetterau stands the high mountain, and on it a stone, der welle fra gestoil (the wild woman's chairs); there is an impression on the rock, as of the limbs of human sitters. The people say the wild folk lived there 'wei di schtan noch mell warn,' while the stones were still soft; afterwards, being persecuted, the man ran away, the wife and child remained in custody at Dauernheim until they died."

The female Moss people, the Moosfräulein ("Moss ladies"), have a queen called the Buschgroßmutter (Buschgrossmutter; "Shrub Grandmother"). Ludwig Bechstein describes her in his folktale 551:
"According to certain tales of the peasantry, a demonic creature dwells near Leutenberg and on the left bank of river Saale, called the Buschgroßmutter ("Shrub Grandmother"). She has many daughters, called Moosfräuleins ("Moss ladies"), with whom she roves around the country at certain times and upon certain holy nights. It is not good to meet her, for she has wild, staring eyes and crazy, unkempt hair. Often she drives around in a little cart or waggon, and at such times it is wise to stay out of her way. Children, in particular, are afraid of this Putzmommel (hooded, female bogey) and delight in whispering tales of her to frighten each other. She is essentially the same spirit as Hulda or Bertha, the Wild Huntress – to whom local tales ascribe a following of children under the guise of the Heimchen (dwarfs, pixies, brownies, hobgoblins) who constitute her attendants in the area she frequents." (Translated from the German text)

See also
 Buschgroßmutter
 Green Man
 Wild Hunt
 Wild man

References

Known research
 
 
 
 
 
 
 
 
 

German legendary creatures
Fairies